The Heritage of the Desert may refer to:

The Heritage of the Desert (novel) (1910), by Zane Grey
The Heritage of the Desert (film) (1924), based on Grey's novel; directed by Irvin Willat
Heritage of the Desert (1932 film), based on Grey's novel; directed by Henry Hathaway
Heritage of the Desert (1939 film), based on Grey's novel; directed by Lesley Selander